Shlomo Halberstam is the name of two rabbis of the Bobov Hasidic dynasty:

 Shlomo Halberstam (first Bobover rebbe) (1847-1905)
 Shlomo Halberstam (third Bobover rebbe) (1907-2000)